Cherrie is both a surname and a given name. Notable people with the name include:

George Kruck Cherrie (1865-1948), American naturalist and explorer
Peter Cherrie (born 1983), Scottish football goalkeeper
Cherrie Ying (born 1983), actress
Cherrie (singer) (born 1991), Swedish R&B singer

See also
 Cherrie, Michigan, a ghost town